Parastenolechia claustrifera is a moth of the family Gelechiidae. It is found in China (Zhejiang) and Taiwan.

The wingspan is about 12 mm. The forewings are white with a dark grey subtriangular submedian fascia not reaching the dorsum. There is a small median patch on the costa, as well as a triangular pre-apical patch on the costa. This patch is connected to the tornal patch. Beyond these patches, the wing is irrorated with yellowish scales and a black spot is found near the apex. The hindwings are grey.

References

Moths described in 1935
Parastenolechia